Transcarga International Airways C.A. is a cargo airline based in Caracas, Venezuela. It operates domestic charter cargo services.

History
A Venezuelan businessman by the name of Julio Marquez Biaggi, also a former pilot for Viasa and KLM, and son of one of Viasa's chairmen, founded Transcarga on October 21, 1998. To help with his endeavor, he was joined by Luis Felipe Ayala V, an expert in the area of finances. The airline started operations in November 2001. It is owned by Julio Marquez Biaggi (with a 99.0% stake) who is CEO of the company.

Transcarga received its first certification as an airline in Venezuela in the year 2001, in 2002, it received the 402 permit from the United States Department of Transportation, enabling it to operate under "wet lease" status to and from the United States, thus generating employment for several Venezuelan pilots.

Since its establishment, the company has strived to maintain the highest quality standards in the national and international cargo transport service. The service has been aimed at small and medium-sized Venezuelan producers, both internally and for the export needs of perishable products such as fish, shellfish, vegetables, fruits, flowers, etc. Another key segment is the parcel service, documents, correspondence, special oil cargo and securities.

The airline's services are aimed to the small and medium Venezuelan producers; serving from the internal national market to the exportation needs of perishable products such as fish, shrimp, vegetables, fruits, flowers, etc. Another key market segment is its courier service of mail, documents, and other packages.

Transcarga is outsourcing its services to larger companies such as Servicio Panamericano de Proteccion, DHL, FedEx, UPS, among others. Transcarga also operates in the Caribbean through a wet lease with the Ameriflight company two daily flights.

In 2020, a Panamanian subsidiary, Cargo Three was founded. The subsidiary has planned to take an Airbus A300B4F, and to begin operations soon.

Destinations

Fleet

Current fleet
, the Transcarga fleet consists of the following aircraft:

Former fleet

Transcarga formerly operated the following aircraft:
1 Aero Commander 500B
10 Cessna 402B
3 Embraer EMB 120FC Brasilia
2 Fairchild Metro III
1 Learjet 35A

Accidents and incidents
On May 20, 2011, a Fairchild Metro III (registered N242DH) suffered a nosegear collapse after landing at Simón Bolívar International Airport. The pilot was minorly injured and recovered after.

On February 9, 2012, a Cessna 402B (registered YV2663) was flying from Antonio Nicolás Briceño Airport to Josefa Camejo International Airport with two crew and one passenger on board. The cargo was consisting of valuables. On approach to Punto Fijo, the crew encountered technical problems and elected to ditch the aircraft off the Amuay refinery. All three occupants were rescued while the aircraft sunk.

On June 6, 2012, an Airbus A300B4F (registered N821SC), leased from Sky Lease Cargo, was damaged beyond repairs after being struck by a Mas Air Boeing 767-300F (registered N314LA) while being parked, causing substantial damage to the right hand stabilizer.

On March 11, 2021, an Airbus A300B4F (registered YV560T) suffered an uncontained engine failure on the left engine during takeoff at El Dorado International Airport. The engine exploded and caused debris to hit buildings near by. The crew aborted takeoff. The aircraft was eventually repaired.

See also
List of airlines of Venezuela

References

External links

Official website

Airlines of Venezuela
Airlines established in 1998
Cargo airlines
Venezuelan companies established in 1998
Venezuelan brands